The 1921 Tour of Flanders was the fifth edition of the Tour of Flanders, a Belgian one-day classic road cycling race, held on 13 March 1921. Ninety cyclists started and thirty-two finished the race, which was won by René Vermandel.

General classification

References

External links

Résultats sur siteducyclisme.net
Résultats sur cyclebase.nl

Tour of Flanders
1921 in road cycling
1921 in Belgian sport
March 1921 sports events